La Iglesia de Nuestra Señora la Reina de los Ángeles (English: "The Church of Our Lady Queen of the Angels") is a historic Catholic church in El Pueblo de los Ángeles Historical Monument in northern downtown Los Angeles, California. The church was founded by the Spanish in the early 19th century when modern-day California was under Spanish rule and known as Alta California in the Viceroyalty of New Spain.

History
La Iglesia de Nuestra Señora la Reina de los Ángeles ("The Church of Our Lady Queen of the Angels") was founded on August 18, 1814, by Franciscan Fray Luis Gil y Taboada. He placed the cornerstone for the new church in the adobe ruins of the original "sub-station mission" here, the Nuestra Señora Reina de los Ángeles Asistencia (founded 1784), thirty years after it was established to serve the settlement founding Los Angeles Pobladores (original settlers). The completed new structure was dedicated on December 8, 1822. A replacement chapel, named La Iglesia de Nuestra Señora de los Ángeles – for Mary, mother of Jesus or "The Church of Our Lady of the Angels" –  was rebuilt using materials of the original church in 1861. The title Reina, meaning "Queen," was added later to the name. For years, the little chapel, which collected the nicknames "La Placita" and "Plaza Church," served as the sole Roman Catholic church in Los Angeles.

20th century
The facility has operated under the auspices of the Claretian Missionary Fathers since 1908.

The building was designated as one of the first three Los Angeles Historic-Cultural Monuments in 1962. It has also been designated as a California Historical Landmark.

21st century

The church is a part of the Archdiocese of Los Angeles and serves as a neighborhood parish church, as well as a cultural landmark.  Since the 1960s it has been retrofitted against earthquakes.  Masses are said in Spanish and English.

California Historical Landmark Marker
California Historical Landmark Marker NO. 144 at the site reads:
NO. 144 NUESTRA SEÑORA LA REINA DE LOS ANGELES - La Iglesia de Nuestra Senora la Reina de Los Angeles-the Church of Our Lady the Queen of the Angels-was dedicated on December 8, 1822 during California's Mexican era. Originally known as La Iglesia de Nuestra Senora de Los Angeles, the church was the only Catholic church for the pueblo. Today it primarily serves the Hispanic population of Los Angeles.

Gallery

See also
List of Spanish missions in California
Los Angeles Plaza Historic District
Olvera Street
List of Los Angeles Historic-Cultural Monuments in Downtown Los Angeles
History of Los Angeles, California
USNS Mission Los Angeles (AO-117) — a Mission Buenaventura class fleet oiler built during World War II.
Sanctuary movement
Porziuncola

Notes

References

External links
 Nuestra Señora Reina de Los Angeles — photo gallery
Sanctuary Movement — history of New Sanctuary Movement — webpage
El Pueblo de Los Angeles Historical Monument — City of Los Angeles

Roman Catholic churches in Los Angeles
Pueblo de Los Ángeles
Roman Catholic churches in California
Roman Catholic Archdiocese of Los Angeles
Spanish missions in California
Buildings and structures in Downtown Los Angeles
History of Los Angeles
Mexican California
The Californias
Los Angeles Historic-Cultural Monuments
California Historical Landmarks
1814 establishments in Alta California
1814 establishments in New Spain
Religious organizations established in 1814
Roman Catholic churches completed in 1861
19th century in Los Angeles
Claretian churches in the United States
El Pueblo de Los Ángeles Historical Monument
Spanish Colonial architecture in California
19th-century Roman Catholic church buildings in the United States